Gibberula cristinae is a species of very small sea snail, a marine gastropod mollusc or micromollusc in the family Cystiscidae.

Description
The length of the shell attains 2.47 mm.

Distribution
This species occurs in the Mediterranean Sea off Calabria, Italy.

References

cristinae
Gastropods described in 2009